Transforming growth factor beta-1-induced transcript 1 protein is a protein that in humans is encoded by the TGFB1I1 gene. Often put together with and studied alongside TGFB1I1 is the mouse homologue HIC-5 ( Hydrogen Peroxide-Inducible Clone-5). As the name suggests, TGFB1I1 is an induced form of the larger family of TGBF1. Studies suggest TGBF1I1 plays a role in processes of cell growth, proliferation, migration, differentiation and senescence. TGFB1I1 is most localized at focal adhesion complexes of cells, although it may be found active in the cytosol, nucleus and cell membrane as well.

Functions 
Transforming growth factor beta-1-induced transcript 1 plays a role in a number of cell functions. Originally, TGFB1I1 was isolated as a senescence-inducing gene from mouse osteoblastic cells through treatment with transforming growth factor beta-1 and hydrogen peroxide. During this, TGFB1I1 was also being independently discovered by numerous other groups and was characterized as a focal adhesion protein, an androgen and glucocorticoid receptor co-activator, a negative regulator of muscle differentiation, and major player in the recovery of arterial media.

Interactions 

TGFB1I1 has been shown to interact with:

 Androgen receptor, 
 Dopamine transporter 
 Hsp27,
 PTK2B, 
 PTK2,  and
 PTPN12.

Model organisms 

Model organisms have been used in the study of TGFB1I1 function. A conditional knockout mouse line called Tgfb1i1tm1b(KOMP)Wtsi was generated at the Wellcome Trust Sanger Institute. Male and female animals underwent a standardized phenotypic screen to determine the effects of deletion. Additional screens performed:  - In-depth immunological phenotyping

See also 
 Transcription coregulator

References

Further reading

External links 
 
 

Gene expression
Transcription coregulators